La Cueva is a census-designated place in Sandoval County, New Mexico, United States. Its population was 168 as of the 2010 census. New Mexico State Road 126 passes through the community.

Geography

Education
It is within the Jemez Valley Public Schools school district.

See also
 List of census-designated places in New Mexico

References

Census-designated places in New Mexico
Census-designated places in Sandoval County, New Mexico